Stranger Pond, a series of two artificial lakes sourced from stormwater discharge from urban and rural areas, are located in the Tuggeranong district of Canberra, within the Australian Capital Territory, Australia.  One is called 'Upper Stranger Pond' and is located in the suburb of Isabella Plains.  The other is called 'Lower Stranger Pond' and is located in the suburb of Bonython. Lower Stranger Pond is widely known simply as 'Stranger Pond'.  Google Maps only labels one of the two ponds – that being the one in Bonython and calls it 'Stranger Pond.'

Features

Stranger Pond was created by the construction of a dam in 1989 across a natural drainage channel, coinciding with urban development in the district. The ponds were built as sediment traps for soil and debris, and to improve the quality of the water flowing into the Murrumbidgee River.

Native wildlife, such as pelicans, swans, kangaroos, and wombats, can be found in and around Stranger Pond.

See also

Lake Tuggeranong
Tuggeranong Creek

References

External links 

 eBird Hotspot: Stranger Pond

Geography of Canberra
Dams completed in 1989
Buildings and structures in Canberra
Murray-Darling basin
Dams in the Australian Capital Territory
Reservoirs in the Australian Capital Territory
Artificial lakes of Australia